Baghdād is a city in Wardak Province in central Afghanistan.

References

Populated places in Maidan Wardak Province